Rudolf Ritter von Alt (28 August 1812  – 12 March 1905) was an Austrian landscape and architectural painter. Born as Rudolf Alt, he could call himself von Alt and bear the title of a Ritter (knight) after he gained nobility in 1889.

Biography
Born in Vienna, he was the son of the lithographer Jakob Alt (1789–1871) and the brother of the painter Franz Alt (1821–1914). He studied at the Akademie der bildenden Künste in Vienna. Hiking-trips through the Austrian Alps and northern Italy awoke a love for landscapes, and he painted with his brush using watercolors in a very realistic and detailed style. In 1833, inspired by a visit to Venice and neighbouring cities, he also made a number of architectural paintings. 

Alt demonstrated a remarkable talent for expressing certain peculiarities in nature. He managed to paint nature authentically by focusing on the different hues of sky, the colour-tone of the air and the vegetation. His later works came closer to Impressionism. His perspectives on architecture were interesting, and he often chose everyday objects to paint. The painting of interior views also became one of his strong points, giving him attention in Vienna.

He visited and worked for a while in Rome and Naples; after that he visited the lakes of Lombardy, then Galicia, Bohemia, Dalmatia, Bavaria and then returned multiple times to Italy. In 1863 he went to the Crimea to paint some views of an estate of the Empress, and in 1867 he went to Sicily.

Alt died in Vienna in 1905. Most of his paintings are held by various museums in Vienna. The Albertina in Vienna hosted a retrospective exhibition from September 2005 to January 2006.

Notes

See also
List of Austrian artists and architects

External links 
 
 Rudolf von Alt collection at the Israel Museum. Retrieved September 2016
 Rudolf von Alt at the aeiou encyclopedia
 Albertina Homepage

1812 births
1905 deaths
19th-century Austrian painters
19th-century Austrian male artists
20th-century Austrian painters
20th-century Austrian male artists
Academy of Fine Arts Vienna alumni
Austrian knights
Austrian landscape painters
Austrian male painters
Burials at the Vienna Central Cemetery